Pyrgus darwazicus is a butterfly of the family Hesperiidae. It is found in Ghissar, Alai, Darvaz and the western Pamirs.

Subspecies
Pyrgus darwazicus darwazicus
Pyrgus darwazicus distinctus de Jong, 1979 (western Pamirs)
Pyrgus darwazicus celsimontius Kauffmann, 1952 (south-western Pamirs, Badahsan, north-eastern Afghanistan)

References

Butterflies described in 1890
Pyrgus
Butterflies of Asia